Mise en place is a French culinary phrase which means "putting in place" or "gather". It refers to the setup required before cooking, and is often used in professional kitchens to refer to organizing and arranging the ingredients (e.g., cuts of meat, relishes, sauces, par-cooked items, spices, freshly chopped vegetables, and other components) that a cook will require for the menu items that are expected to be prepared during a shift.

The practice can be applied in home kitchens.

In the kitchen, the phrase is used as a noun (i.e., the setup of the array of ingredients), a verb (i.e., the process of preparing) and a state of mind. The term's broader meanings can be applied to classrooms, hospitals, IT departments, and elsewhere.

Use outside of cooking
The term has also been used outside of cooking: psychologists Weisberg, et al., used the phrase to refer to "how one's stance towards a given environment places constraints on what one feels able to do within that environment, and how these assessments and predispositions impact the process of preparing to act." They used the term in a study of how a school became safer after security measureslike metal detectors and bars on the windowswere removed, leading to the unexpected outcome.

See also
 Knolling
Glossary of French expressions in English

References

External links

 À la carte webpage discussing mise en place
 NPR Morning Edition story about mise en place
 “Mise en Place”: Become More Efficient in the Kitchen and in Life: an article on implementing the concept of mise en place.

French words and phrases
Cooking
Ordering
Time management